The Raijor Dal  (RD) is an Indian political party based in the state of Assam. The party believes in the principles of Secularism,  SocialismProgressivism, Ethnocentrism and opposes Citizenship Amendment Act as it believes that it is thread to Assamese Identity as Bangladeshi Hindus can get citizenship in Assam.

The formation of the party was the culmination of more than 15 years of struggle of its parent mass organization Krishak Mukti Sangram Samiti(KMSS) for land rights, farmers rights, ecological conservation and protection of lives and livelihoods of the working classes of Assam. In the wake of the statewide Anti-CAA movement where KMSS and 70 other organizations played a leading role, Akhil Gogoi, the then Chief advisor of KMSS and many others were arrested under draconian laws like the UAPA by the ruling BJP government, A new party was proposed on 2 October 2020 (when Gogoi was still in jail) with an aim to overthrow the BJP from power in Assam and provide a progressive regional alternative to the people of the state. Later,  Raijor Dal was formally launched on 8 January 2021 at 1st Moran convention . The party's stated political ideology is  progressive sub-nationalism which encapsulates ideas of  federalism, equal rights self-reliance and scientific temper.

History 
The party was founded on 2 October 2021 by KMSS leader Akhil Gogoi, who at the time was in jail for his participation in the Citizenship Amendment Act protests.

The party was officially announced by filmmaker Jahnu Baruah who had extended his support along with Assamese film actress Zerifa Wahid and lawyer Arup Borbora.

The party is preparing pitch in the upcoming 2021 Assam Legislative Assembly election by intensifying anti-CAA protest apart from mounting pressure on the government to ensure release of Akhil Gogoi.

Electoral Performance 

For 2021 Assam Legislative Assembly election, Raijor Dal joined an alliance with Assam Jatiya Parishad an offshoot of All Assam Students Union and Asom Jatiyatabadi Yuba Chatra Parishad. According to the seat-sharing agreement, Assam Jatiya Parishad will contest on 68 seats, and Raijor Dal will contest on 29 seats of Assam.

State Legislative Assembly Elections

References

Political parties established in 2020
2020 establishments in Assam
Political parties in Assam
State political parties in Assam
Regionalist parties in India